Marijuana (word), or cannabis, is a mixture of dried up flowers from the plant.

Marijuana or Marihuana may also refer to:

Film
Marihuana (1936 film), an American exploitation film
Marihuana (El monstruo verde), a 1936 Mexican film
Marihuana (1950 film), or The Marihuana Story, an Argentine film
Marijuana (film), a 1968 anti-drug documentary

Other uses
Marihuana (novel), by Cornell Woolrich, 1941
Marijuana (EP), by Brujeria, 2000
"Marijuana" (Kid Cudi song), 2010
Marijuana Pepsi Vandyck, an American educator

See also

Cannabis (disambiguation)
List of names for cannabis